Vladimir Iosifovich Baer (November 12, 1853 – May 27, 1905) was a Russian Captain 1st rank of the Russo-Japanese War. He commanded the Oslyabya, the flagship of the Second Division, during the Battle of Tsushima before being killed in the battle.

Biography
On September 16, 1870, Baer was accepted as a student into the Naval Cadet Corps and graduated on March 31, 1871, as a Garde de la Marine. By April 12, 1874, he was assigned to the 1st Naval Crew and promoted to midshipman on August 30, 1875. Baer received his first command when he was assigned to the Latnik on January 30, 1876, before being transferred to the Siberian Flotilla on April 9, 1876. He arrived at Shanghai on August 1, 1876, to retrieve the gunboat Sable three days later before being given command of the 3rd Company of Siberian Naval Crew from December 20, 1877, to January 11, 1878. He was then assigned to the Vostok on March 3, 1878, him becoming the auditor on September 29, 1878. By July 4, 1879, he was transferred to the clipper Abrek as the auditor before being promoted to Lieutenant on January 1, 1880, but was decommissioned on October 21 due to poor health from staying in Siberia for an extensive amount of time. However, on April 11, 1881, he was transferred to the Baltic Fleet and arrived at a new station by September 30, 1881. Baer was made the inspector of the corvette Boyarin on October 20, 1882, along with being transferred to the 7th Naval Crew. On May 30, 1884, he was transferred to the 5th Naval Crew aboard the Dzhigit and from June 24, 1885, to July 6, 1887, as the auditor. Baer was then made a student of classes dedicated to naval mines from January 13 to March 29, 1888, and on March 26, 1890, he was the senior officer of the monitor Lava.

He continued this by becoming the senior officer of the armored boat Enchantress of the 10th Naval Crew on October 1, 1891, and the senior officer of the clipper Kreyser on January 1, 1892, but was arrested on December 9, 1894, for violating Article 185 of the naval code and remained incarcerated before being released on February 18, 1895, by orders of the Minister of the Navy and given command of the port ship Moguchiy two days later. From February 5, 1896, to December 11, 1897, he was given command of the mine cruiser Lieutenant Ilyin and became a full-time student of the Nikolaev Naval Academy from August 13, 1896, to May 10, 1897, as part of its naval science class. From December 6, 1897, to March 22, 1899, he was given command of the gunboat Khrabryy and on March 22, 1899, he left to Philadelphia to oversee the construction of the Retvizan and the Varyag and was promoted to Captain 1st rank on April 18, 1899. On January 1, 1900, Baer was transferred to the 13th Naval Crew and brought the Varyag back to Russia on January 29, 1901. On July 2, 1901, he was made chairman of the artillery at the Geisler and Co. electrical plant installed on the Varyag but surrendered command on March 1, 1903. By July 14, 1903, he requested a two-month's leave due to illness and from December 6, 1903, to January 26, 1904, he was given command of the 17th Naval Crew. From January 26 to May 17, 1904, he was given command of the 5th Naval Crew along with Grand Duke Alexei Alexandrovich and commanded the Oslyabya on May 17, 1904. After the Oslyabya began sinking during the Battle of Tsushima, despite the other officers attempting to convince Baer to retreat for Kronstadt and to be promoted to Rear Admiral, Baer refused to leave the ship and opted to go down with the ship.

Awards
Order of Saint Stanislaus, III Class (January 1, 1884)
Order of Saint Anna, III Class (January 1, 1889)
Order of Saint Stanislaus, II Class (1894)
 (March 21, 1896)
Order of Saint Anna, II Class (December 6, 1896)

Order of Saint Vladimir, IV Class with a bow for 20 naval campaigns (1901)
Order of St. Vladimir, III Class (December 6, 1904)

Foreign Awards
: Order of the Double Dragon, 2nd and 3rd Class (1902)
: Order of the Dannebrog, Commander's Cross with Star (1901)
: Order of the Red Eagle, 2nd Class (1901)
: Legion of Honour, Officer (1901)

References

Bibliography
Dotsenko V.D. Marine Biographical Dictionary. - St. Petersburg. 1995.

1853 births
1905 deaths
People from Smolensk Oblast
People from Smolensk Governorate
Imperial Russian Navy officers
Captains who went down with the ship
Russian military personnel of the Russo-Japanese War
Russian military personnel killed in the Russo-Japanese War
Recipients of the Order of St. Anna, 2nd class
Recipients of the Order of St. Anna, 3rd class
Recipients of the Order of St. Vladimir, 3rd class
Recipients of the Order of St. Vladimir, 4th class
Recipients of the Order of Saint Stanislaus (Russian), 2nd class
Recipients of the Order of Saint Stanislaus (Russian), 3rd class
Chevaliers of the Légion d'honneur
Naval Cadet Corps alumni